The canton of Quettreville-sur-Sienne is an administrative division of the Manche department, northwestern France. It was created at the French canton reorganisation which came into effect in March 2015. Its seat is in Quettreville-sur-Sienne.

It consists of the following communes:

La Baleine
Belval
Cametours
Cerisy-la-Salle
Gavray-sur-Sienne
Grimesnil
Hambye
Hauteville-sur-Mer
Lengronne
Le Mesnil-Garnier
Le Mesnil-Villeman
Montaigu-les-Bois
Montmartin-sur-Mer
Montpinchon
Notre-Dame-de-Cenilly
Ouville
Quettreville-sur-Sienne
Roncey
Saint-Denis-le-Gast
Saint-Denis-le-Vêtu
Saint-Martin-de-Cenilly
Savigny
Tourneville-sur-Mer
Ver

References

Cantons of Manche